Krasen or Krasen Kale is a Bulgarian fortress near the village of Bata in the Pazardzhik Province.

The castle has been dated to the 10th century AD and has since been ruined.

References 

Castles in Bulgaria
Buildings and structures in Pazardzhik Province
Panagyurishte